The Norfolk and Western Railway , commonly called the N&W, was a US class I railroad, formed by more than 200 railroad mergers between 1838 and 1982. It was headquartered in Roanoke, Virginia, for most of its existence. Its motto was "Precision Transportation"; it had a variety of nicknames, including "King Coal" and "British Railway of America". In 1986, N&W merged with Southern Railway to form today’s Norfolk Southern Railway.

The N&W was famous for manufacturing its own steam locomotives, which were built at the Roanoke Shops, as well as its own hopper cars. After 1960, N&W was the last major Class I railroad using steam locomotives; the last remaining Y class 2-8-8-2s would eventually be retired in 1961.

In December 1959, the N&W merged with the Virginian Railway (reporting mark VGN), a longtime rival in the Pocahontas coal region.

In 1980, the N&W merged its business operation with those of the Southern Railway, another profitable carrier, to create the Norfolk Southern Corporation holding company. The N&W and the Southern Railway continued as separate railroads operating under the single holding company.

In 1982, the Southern Railway was renamed Norfolk Southern Railway and the holding company transferred the Norfolk & Western Railway to the control of the newly renamed company.

History

Predecessors

City Point, Southside and Virginia and Tennessee railroads
The N&W's earliest predecessor was the City Point Railroad (CPRR), a  short-line railroad formed in 1838 to extend from City Point (now part of the independent city of Hopewell, Virginia), a port on the tidal James River, to Petersburg, Virginia, on the fall line of the shallower Appomattox River. In 1854, CPRR became part of the South Side Railroad, which connected Petersburg with Lynchburg, where it interchanged through traffic with the Virginia and Tennessee Railroad (V&T) and the James River and Kanawha Canal.

Norfolk and Petersburg Railroad
William Mahone (1826–95), an 1847 engineering graduate of the Virginia Military Institute (VMI), was employed by Francis Mallory to build the Norfolk and Petersburg Railroad (N&P) and eventually became its president in the pre-Civil War era. Construction of N&P began in 1853. Mahone's innovative corduroy roadbed through the Great Dismal Swamp near Norfolk, Virginia, employed a log foundation laid at right angles beneath the surface of the swamp. It is still in use 150 years later and it withstands immense tonnages of coal traffic.

Mahone married Otelia Butler, from Smithfield in Isle of Wight County, Virginia, a daughter of Robert Butler (1784–1853), a Virginia state treasurer. Popular legend has it that Otelia and William Mahone traveled along the newly completed N&P naming stations along the  tangent between Suffolk and Petersburg from Ivanhoe, a book she was reading by Walter Scott. From Scott's historical Scottish novels, Otelia chose the place names of Windsor, Waverly and Wakefield. She tapped the Scottish Clan "McIvor" for the name of Ivor, a small Southampton County town. When they could not agree on a name for a station just west of the Sussex County line in Prince George, it is said that the young couple invented a new word in honor of their "dispute", which is how the tiny community of Disputanta was named. The N&P was completed in 1858.

Civil War
Of small stature, dynamic "Little Billy" Mahone became a major general in the Confederate Army during the American Civil War. He was widely regarded as the hero of the Battle of the Crater during the Siege of Petersburg in 1864–65. Otelia Mahone served as a nurse in the Confederate capital of Richmond.

The N&P was severed by the war. The portion east of the Blackwater River at Zuni, Virginia, was held by the Union for most of the war. The eastern portion of the City Point Railroad played a crucial role for Union General Ulysses S. Grant during the Siege of Petersburg, and was operated by the United States Military Railroad. The South Side Railroad was also heavily damaged.

Early years

Beginning as the Atlantic, Mississippi & Ohio Railroad
William and Otelia Mahone were illustrious characters in post-bellum Virginia. Mahone got quickly to work restoring "his" N&P, and resumed his dream of linking the three trunk lines across the southern tier of Virginia to reach points to the west. He became president of all three, and drove the 1870 merger of N&P, South Side Railroad and the Virginia and Tennessee Railroad to form the Atlantic, Mississippi and Ohio Railroad (AM&O). The AM&O extended  from Norfolk to Bristol, Virginia. The Mahones moved to the headquarters city of Lynchburg, the midpoint of the AM&O. The acronym AM&O was said to stand for "All Mine and Otelia's."

The AM&O operated profitably in the early 1870s but like many railroads encountered financial problems during the Panic of 1873. A fourth road of the AM&O family was planned to extend west through the Cumberland Gap to Kentucky, but was never built. Mahone retained control of AM&O for several more years before his relationship with English and Scottish bondholders deteriorated in 1876 and receivers were appointed to oversee his work. After several years of operating under receiverships, Mahone's role as a railroad builder ended in 1881 when northern financial interests took control.

At the foreclosure auction, the AM&O was purchased by E.W. Clark & Co., a private banking firm in Philadelphia with ties to the large Pennsylvania Railroad. The PRR was seeking a southern connection for its Shenandoah Valley Railroad (SVRR), which was then under construction up the valley from the Potomac River.

Name change to Norfolk and Western

In 1881, the AM&O was reorganized and renamed Norfolk and Western, a name perhaps taken from an 1850s charter application filed by citizens of Norfolk, Virginia. George Frederick Tyler became president. Frederick J. Kimball, a civil engineer and partner in E.W. Clark & Co., became First Vice President. Henry Fink, whom Mahone had hired in 1855, became Second Vice President and General Superintendent.

Kimball and his board of directors selected Big Lick, a small Virginia village on the Roanoke River, to be the junction of SVRR and the N&W. Big Lick was later renamed Roanoke, Virginia. Over time, Roanoke began to grow and in the 1950s, reached a population of over 90,000.

At its founding, the N&W primarily transported agricultural products. Kimball, who had a strong interest in geology, led the railroad's efforts to open the Pocahontas coalfields in western Virginia and southern West Virginia. In mid-1881, the N&W acquired the franchises to four other lines: the New River Railroad, Mining and Manufacturing Company, the Bluestone Railroad, and the East River Railroad. Consolidated into the New River Railroad Company, with Kimball as president, these railroads became the basis for N&W's New River Division, which was soon built from New Kanawha (near East Radford) up the west bank of the New River through Pulaski County and into Giles County to the mouth of the East River near Glen Lyn, Virginia. From there, the new line ran up the East River, crossing the Virginia-West Virginia border several times to reach the coalfields to the west near the Great Flat Top Mountain. Coal transported to Norfolk soon became NW's primary commodity, and led to great wealth and profitability.

Kimball served as N&W president from 1883 to 1895. Under his leadership, the N&W continued expansion westward with its lines through the wilderness of West Virginia with the Ohio Extension, eventually extending north across the Ohio River to Columbus, Ohio by the Scioto Valley Railroad. Acquisition of other lines, including the Cincinnati, Portsmouth and Virginia Railroad (CP&V) (which it had long supported and leased) extended the N&W system west along the Ohio River to Cincinnati, Ohio, south from Lynchburg to Durham, North Carolina, and south from Roanoke to Winston-Salem, North Carolina. By the time Kimball died in 1903, the railroad had attained the basic structure it would use for more than 60 years.

In 1890 the N&W bought out the Shenandoah Valley Railroad. This gave the railroad a reach north of the Potomac River and the Virginia-Maryland border, and a line with territory reaching as far north as Harrisburg, Pennsylvania. This would become referred to as the Shenandoah Valley Division.

Coal

The PCCC was later renamed the Pocahontas Land Corporation (PLC) and is now a subsidiary of NS.

As the availability and fame of high-quality Pocahontas bituminous coal increased, economic forces took over. Coal operators and their employees settled dozens of towns in southern West Virginia, and in the next few years, as coal demand swelled, some of them amassed fortunes. The countryside was soon sprinkled with tipples, coke ovens, houses for workers, company stores and churches. In the four decades before the Crash of 1929 and subsequent Depression, these coal towns flourished. One example was the small community of Bramwell, West Virginia, which in its heyday boasted the highest per capita concentration of millionaires in the country.

In 1886, the N&W tracks were extended directly to coal piers at Lambert's Point, which was located in Norfolk County just north of the City of Norfolk on the Elizabeth River, where one of the busiest coal export facilities in the world was built to reach Hampton Roads shipping. A residential section was also developed to house the families of the workers. Many early residents of Lambert's Point were involved in the coal industry.

Roanoke Shops
The company was famous for building its own steam locomotives, a practice rare outside Britain (where most railways either built their own locomotives or had outside contractors build locomotives to their designs). The locomotives were built at the Roanoke Shops at Roanoke. The Shops employed thousands of craftsmen, who refined their products over the years. The A, J, and Y6 locomotives, designed, built and maintained by NW personnel, brought the company industry-wide fame for its excellence in steam power. The N&W's commitment to steam power was due in part to its investment in the manufacturing capacity and human resources to build and operate steam locomotives, and partially due to the major commodity it hauled, coal. During the 1950s, N&W rebuilt its W Class 2-8-0 Consolidations into Shop Co W6 0-8-0Ts.  In 1960, the N&W became the last major railroad in the United States to abandon steam locomotives for diesel-electric motive power.

Today, the Roanoke Shops continued to build and repair rolling stock until 2020 when NS closed them.

Later years

Roanoke & Southern
The Roanoke & Southern Railway Company was organized in 1887, succeeding separate companies called Roanoke & Southern in North Carolina and Virginia. Norfolk and Western leased the Roanoke & Southern (called the Norfolk, Roanoke & Southern Rail Road by 1896) starting in 1892 but it became part of Norfolk and Western in 1911.

World Wars, Great Depression, and efficiencies

The N&W operated profitably through World War I and World War II and paid regular dividends throughout the Depression. During World War I, the N&W was jointly operated with VGN under the USRA's wartime takeover of the Pocahontas Roads. The operating efficiencies were significant, and after the war, when the railroads were returned to their respective owners and competitive status, the N&W never lost sight of the VGN and its low-gradient routing through Virginia. N&W meanwhile during World War 2 used their J's, K1's, A Class, and S1 Switchers to handle the troop trains from Ohio to Norfolk, a point of embarkation. Other three were New York, San Francisco, and San Diego.  However, the US Interstate Commerce Commission (ICC) turned down attempts at combining the roads until 1959, when a proposed N&W-VGN merger was finally approved.

The N&W also operated safely in this time, being the recipient of the Gold E. H. Harriman Award for 1938. In a promotional booklet published in 1939, the N&W wrote "For the second time in 12 years, the American Museum of Safety has awarded the Harriman Memorial Gold Medal to the Norfolk & Western Railway for the outstanding safety record during 1938 among class I railroads of the United States." It is further noted that the railway carried one million passengers more than  without incident in the period from 1924 to 1938.

Acquiring the Virginian Railway

VGN was conceived and built by William Nelson Page and Henry Huttleston Rogers. Page had helped engineer and build the Chesapeake & Ohio Railway (C&O) through the mountains of West Virginia and Rogers had already become a millionaire and a principal of Standard Oil before their partnership was formed early in the 20th century.

Initially, their project was an -long short line railroad. After failing to establish favorable rates to interchange coal traffic with the big railroads (who shut them out through collusion), the project expanded. Rogers was apparently a silent partner in the early stages, and the bigger railroads did not take Page seriously. However, the partners planned and then built a "Mountains to Sea" railroad from the coal fields of southern West Virginia to port near Norfolk at Sewell's Point in the harbor of Hampton Roads. They accomplished this right under the noses of the pre-existing and much bigger C&O and N&W railroads and their leaders by forming two small intrastate railroads, Deepwater Railway, in West Virginia, and Tidewater Railway in Virginia. Once right-of-way and land acquisitions had been secured, the two small railroads were merged in 1907 to form the Virginian Railway.

Engineered by Page and financed almost entirely from Rogers' personal resources, VGN lines were laid on the principle that picking the best route and buying the best equipment would save operating expenses.

Mark Twain spoke at VGN's dedication in Norfolk, Virginia, only 6 weeks before Rogers died in May 1909 after his only inspection trip on the newly completed railroad. That June, Booker T. Washington made a whistle-stop speaking tour on VGN, traveling in Rogers' private car, Dixie, and later revealing that Rogers had been instrumental in funding many small country schools and institutions of higher education in the South for the betterment of Black communities.

VGN operated over more modern alignments than the C&O, and the N&W, and its track was built to the highest standards. It provided major competition for coal traffic to C&O and the N&W. The  VGN followed Rogers' philosophy throughout its profitable history, earning the nickname "Richest Little Railroad in the World." It operated some of the largest and most powerful steam, electric, and diesel locomotives.

The VGN electrified  of its route between 1922 and 1926 at a cost of $15 million, and had its own power plant at Narrows, Virginia. It shared electrical resources with N&W from 1925 to 1950, when the N&W discontinued its own, shorter, electrified section through the Elkhorn Tunnel and Great Flat Top Mountain region. The VGN track was de-electrified in 1962, after the N&W-VGN merger.

Merger era: 1960–1982

In 1955, the N&W operated in North Carolina, Virginia, Kentucky, West Virginia, Maryland, and Ohio. In 1959, the Interstate Commerce Commission (ICC) approved VGN's merger into the N&W.

In 1964, the former Wabash; Nickel Plate; Pittsburgh and West Virginia Railway; and Akron, Canton and Youngstown Railroad were brought into the system in one of the most complex mergers of the era. This consolidation, plus the 1976 addition of a more direct route to Chicago, Illinois, made N&W an important Midwestern railroad that provided direct single-line service between the Atlantic Ocean and the Great Lakes and Mississippi River.

In the late 1960s, the N&W acquired Dereco, a holding company that owned the Delaware & Hudson (D&H) and Erie Lackawanna (EL) railroads. Dereco's troubled railroads were not merged into the N&W: EL eventually joined Conrail and D&H was sold to Guilford Transportation Industries; it is now part of Canadian Pacific.

In 1970, the N&W operated in North Carolina, Virginia, Kentucky, West Virginia, Maryland, Ohio, Pennsylvania, New York, Indiana, Michigan, Illinois, Missouri, and Iowa.

On September 1, 1981, the N&W acquired Illinois Terminal Railroad. The N&W was also a major investor in Piedmont Airlines. Sometime in the 1980s the song "Cargo Movin' People" was written and recorded, however it never was officially released to the public. It eventually made its way onto a DVD program titled Rails to Roanoke by Mark I Video in 1987.

By 1996, N&W ran in most of the Midwest and Eastern states. Many N&W lines by 1998 were abandoned and some of them were never used again. However, the Norfolk to Bluefield line still exists but traffic has slowed because of its 12-mile 1.2% grade.

Autoracks
In the 1950s, Canadian National Railway (CN) introduced a group of innovative bi-level autorack railcars. These autoracks were a big success and helped lead to the development of today's fully enclosed autoracks. Tri-level autoracks were developed in the 1970s.

During the 1960s, autoracks took over rail transportation of newly completed automobiles in North America. They carried more cars in the same space and were easier to load and unload than the boxcars formerly used. Ever-larger auto carriers and specialized terminals were developed by NW and other railroads.

The railroads were able to provide lower costs and greater protection from in-transit damage, such as that which may occur due to vandalism or weather and traffic conditions on unenclosed truck trailers. Using the autoracks, the railroads became the primary long-distance transporter of completed automobiles, one of few commodities where the industry has been able to overcome trucking in competition.

Becoming part of the Norfolk Southern Corporation
In 1980, the profitable N&W teamed up with the Southern Railway, another profitable company, to form the Norfolk Southern Corporation and it paved the way for today's Norfolk Southern Railway (formerly the Southern Railway) and compete more effectively with CSX Transportation, itself a combination of smaller railroads in the eastern half of the United States.

Today, former N&W trackage remains a vital portion of the Norfolk Southern Railway, a Fortune 500 company. The headquarters of the Norfolk Southern Railway and the parent Norfolk Southern Corporation are near the coal piers at Lambert's Point.

Passenger operations

While the Powhatan Arrow (all-coach, Norfolk–Cincinnati/Columbus) was the N&W's flagship passenger train, sporting a regal maroon livery with gold trim and hauled by a J Class 4-8-4 Northern Type steam locomotive, the railroad also operated a number of other passenger trains. These include:

 The Cavalier (coaches and Pullmans, Norfolk–Cincinnati/Columbus).
 The Pocahontas (coaches and Pullmans, Norfolk–Cincinnati/Columbus).

The N&W also participated in five inter-line passenger trains:
 Trains 1 and 2 (Roanoke–Hagerstown, Maryland) which continued in a pool arrangement with the Pennsylvania Railroad from Hagerstown to Harrisburg to New York via North Philadelphia. This allowed for a trip from western Virginia to New York, bypassing Washington, D.C. and Baltimore. In contrast with other N&W trains from south of Roanoke which traveled east from Roanoke, this overnight train continued north from Roanoke along the Shenandoah Valley Route, via Waynesboro, VA. Sleeping car passengers would be able to take the trip continuously, without a change of coach in Harrisburg.
 Cannon Ball (New York – Norfolk in conjunction with Pennsylvania Railroad, Richmond, Fredericksburg and Potomac Railroad, and the Atlantic Coast Line Railroad).
 Birmingham Special (New York – Birmingham, Alabama in conjunction with the Pennsylvania Railroad and Southern Railway).
 The Pelican (New York – New Orleans in conjunction with the Pennsylvania Railroad and Southern Railway).
 The Tennessean (New York – Memphis in conjunction with the Pennsylvania Railroad and Southern Railway).

The last three were unusual in that the Southern Railway operated the trains, either side of the N&W stretch between Lynchburg and Bristol.

The Norfolk-bound trains arrived at Norfolk Terminal Station, which also served as the N&W company offices.

Steam locomotive types on the Norfolk and Western
 
 Class A: 2-6-6-4 simple articulated Top Speed: 70 mph
 Class Y1 though Y6b: 2-8-8-2 Mallet Top Speed: 60 mph
 Class J: 4-8-4 Top Speed: 110 mph
 Classes K1 and K2: 4-8-2 Mountain Top Speed: 80 mph
 Classes M, M1, and M2: 4-8-0 Mastodon Top Speed: 55 mph
 Class S1: 0-8-0 switchers Top Speed: 50 mph
 Class Z1: 2-6-6-2 Top Speed: 60 mph
 Class E1: 4-6-2 Top Speed: 65 mph
 Class E2: 4-6-2 Top Speed: 70 mph
 Class W: 2-8-0 Top Speed: 45 mph

Surviving steam locomotives

The N&W had run excursion trains since its first days of passenger traffic, and deliberately powered them with steam engines after 1960, when most other trains had been switched to diesels. The excursion trains were powered by several of the N&W's famous steam locomotives, including J class #611 and A class #1218. The practice continued after the 1982 merger, under the first president of the merged Norfolk Southern, Robert B. Claytor, but was finally halted in 1994.

Today, #1218 is on static display at the Virginia Museum of Transportation in Roanoke, Virginia; locomotive #611 has been restored to working order for the VMT by the North Carolina Transportation Museum; N&W class Y6a #2156 has been brought to Roanoke from the National Museum of Transportation in St. Louis, Missouri; and Class M #475 continues to operate at the Strasburg Railroad in Strasburg, Pennsylvania, where 611 will participate in Fall 2019 for the "Reunion of Steam" event.

N&W Class M #433 survives at the trailhead of the Virginia Creeper in Abingdon, Virginia. The Virginia Creeper runs on the old Right of Way of the Norfolk and Western Abingdon branch line.

N&W Class E #578 survives at the Ohio Railway museum in Worthington, Ohio.

Four other engines survive known as the Lost Engines of Roanoke; a group of engines that survived in a Roanoke Scrapyard from the late 1950s until all were retrieved in 2009. These four engines included a Class W2 2-8-0 #917, Class M2 #1118 and #1134, and Class M2c #1151. #917 is displayed without a tender in Bellville, Ohio as a display for a restaurant. M2 #1118 is owned by the Roanoke Chapter Historical Society without a tender. M2 #1134 is displayed in Portsmouth VA at the Railroad Museum of Virginia with a tender. M2c #1151 is owned by the Virginia Museum of Transportation, and currently sits unrestored with a tender from an A class engine.

N&W Class Y3a #2050 is also preserved at the Illinois Railway Museum in Union, Illinois.

Leaders of the Norfolk and Western
Thousands of men and women worked for the AM&O and NW after the Civil War. Among the leaders were:

William Mahone
George F. Tyler
Henry Fink
Frederick J. Kimball
Lucius E. Johnson
Nicholas D. Maher
William J. Jenks
Arthur C. Needles
Robert Hall Smith
Stuart T. Saunders
Herman H. Pevler
John P. Fishwick
Robert B. Claytor
Richard F. Dunlap

Heritage unit
As a part of Norfolk Southern's 30th anniversary, the company painted 20 new locomotives into predecessor schemes.  NS #8103, a GE ES44AC, was painted into the Norfolk and Western's blue scheme. NS also has SD40 #1580, of N&W heritage, stored at Altoona Works, awaiting restoration to its original N&W colors. However, as of 2021, there is still no information on where #1580 will go when it will be donated.

See also

 Norfolk and Western Railway Company Historic District
 Norfolk and Western Railway Freight Station
 List of Norfolk and Western Railway locomotives
 Norfolk and Western 611 - Class J 4-8-4
 Norfolk & Western 475 – Class M 4-8-0
 Norfolk & Western 1218 – Class A 2-6-6-4
 Norfolk & Western 2156 – Class Y6a 2-8-8-2
 Dinwiddie County Pullman Car

References

Notes
 N&W System Map 1965

Further reading
Blake, Nelson Morehouse, Phd. (1935) William Mahone of Virginia; Soldier and Political Insurgent, Garrett and Massie Publishers; Richmond, VA
Dixon, Thomas W, Jr., (1994) Appalachian Coal Mines & Railroads. Lynchburg, Virginia: TLC Publishing Inc. 
Dow, Andrew (1999) Norfolk and Western Coal Cars: From 1881 to 1998. Motorbooks Intl. 
Ferrell, Mallory Hope, (2007) Norfolk & Western: Steam's Last Stand. Hundman Publishing 

Huddleston, Eugene L, Ph.D. (2002) Appalachian Conquest, Lynchburg, Virginia: TLC Publishing Inc. 
Lambie, Joseph T., (1954) From Mine to Market: The History of Coal Transportation on the Norfolk and Western Railway New York: New York University Press
Lewis, Lloyd D., (1992) The Virginian Era. Lynchburg, Virginia: TLC Publishing Inc.
Lewis, Lloyd D., (1994) Norfolk & Western and Virginian Railways in Color by H. Reid. Lynchburg, Virginia: TLC Publishing Inc. 
King, Ed, (1997) Norfolk & Western in the Appalachians: From the Blue Ridge to the Big Sandy. Kalmbach Publishing Company 
Middleton, William D., (1974) (1st ed.). When The Steam Railroads Electrified Milwaukee, Wisconsin: Kalmbach Publishing Co. 
Prince, Richard E., (1980) Norfolk & Western Railway, Pocahontas Coal Carrier, R.E. Prince; Millard, NE 
Reid, H. (1961)., The Virginian Railway (1st ed.). Milwaukee, Wisconsin: Kalmbach Publishing Co.
Reisweber, Kurt, (1995) Virginian Rails 1953–1993 (1st ed.) Old Line Graphics. 
Striplin, E. F. Pat., (1981) The Norfolk & Western: a history Roanoke, Va. : Norfolk and Western Railway Co. 
Traser, Donald R., (1998) Virginia Railway Depots. Old Dominion Chapter, National Railway Historical Society. 
Wiley, Aubrey and Wallace, Conley (1985). The Virginian Railway Handbook. Lynchburg, Virginia: W-W Publications.
Wardeb, William E., (1996) Norfolk & Western Railway's Magnificent Mallets: The Y Class 2-8-8-2s . Motorbooks International
Cuthriell, N.L. (1956) Coal On The Move Via The Virginian Railway, reprinted with permission of Norfolk Southern Corporation in 1995 by Norfolk & Western Historical Society, Inc. 
Warden, William and Miller, Kenneth L., (2000) Norfolk & Western Passenger Service: 1946-1971. Lynchburg, Virginia: TLC Publishing Inc.

External links

Norfolk & Western Historical Society
Norfolk & Western Steam
Norfolk and Western 1966 timetable

 
Predecessors of the Norfolk Southern Railway
Former Class I railroads in the United States
Defunct Illinois railroads
Defunct Indiana railroads
Defunct Iowa railroads
Defunct Kentucky railroads
Defunct Maryland railroads
Defunct Michigan railroads
Defunct Missouri railroads
Defunct New York (state) railroads
Defunct North Carolina railroads
Defunct Ohio railroads
Defunct Pennsylvania railroads
Defunct Virginia railroads
Defunct West Virginia railroads
Railroads in the Chicago metropolitan area
Railway companies established in 1896
Railway companies disestablished in 1998
Defunct Ontario railways
1896 establishments in Virginia
1998 disestablishments in Virginia
American companies established in 1896
American companies disestablished in 1998